Leela Sarkar is a Singaporean-Indian Malayalam language writer from Kerala, South India. She won Sahitya Akademi Translation Prize in 1993 and Kerala Sahitya Akademi Award for Translation in 2000.

Biography
Leela was born in Singapore on 17 May 1934. Her father, Dr. K.K. Menon was from Kodakara, Thrissur District, Kerala and her mother was from Thottippal, Irinjalakuda, Kerala. At the time of the Second World War, Leela's family returned to India from Singapore. After completing primary education, she graduated from St. Mary's College, Thrissur and Maharajas College, Eranakulam. She married Dipesh Sarkar from Bengal. She is now settled in Mumbai. Leela learned Bengali from the course conducted by Vanga Bhasha Prachara Samiti, Dadar. She published a Bengali - Malayalam Dictionary in 2004.

Leela translated a number of books written by Bengali writers into Malayalam. She worked in Jahangir Art Gallery for more than nine years. Later, she served as the executive in the Bombay office of C.R.Y. Charitable Society.

Bibliography
Abhayam
Abhimanyu
Asamayam
Amma
Dooradarshini
Mahamoham
Ichamati
Aranyakam
Ente Penkuttikkalam
Jaran
Vamshavruksham
Fera
Satyam, Asatyam
Kaivarthakandam
Ramapadachoudhari
Bharatiya Suvarna Kadhakal - Munshi Premchand
Aranyathinte Adhikaram
Manasa Vasudha
Nilaaparvatham

Awards
Vivarthaka Ratnam award from Bharat Bhavan in 2014 
Sahitya Akademi Translation Prize in 1993 for Aranyathinte Adhikaram
Kerala Sahitya Akademi Award in 2000 for Manasa Vasudha

References

1934 births
Living people
Malayalam-language writers
Women writers from Kerala
Maharaja's College, Ernakulam alumni
Singaporean people of Indian descent
20th-century Indian translators
Recipients of the Sahitya Akademi Prize for Translation